The Artemis program is a robotic and human Moon exploration program led by the United States' National Aeronautics and Space Administration (NASA) along with three partner agencies: European Space Agency (ESA), Japan Aerospace Exploration Agency (JAXA), and Canadian Space Agency (CSA). The Artemis program intends to reestablish a human presence on the Moon for the first time since the Apollo 17 mission in 1972. The major components of the program are the Space Launch System (SLS), Orion spacecraft, Lunar Gateway space station and the commercial Human Landing Systems. The program's long-term goal is to establish a permanent base camp on the Moon and facilitate human missions to Mars.

The Artemis program is a collaboration of government space agencies and private spaceflight companies, bound together by the Artemis Accords and supporting contracts. As of December 2022, twenty-three countries and one territory have signed the accords, including traditional U.S. space partners (such as the European Space Agency as well as agencies from Canada, Japan, and the United Kingdom) and emerging space powers such as Brazil, South Korea, and the United Arab Emirates. 

The Artemis program was formally established in 2017 during the Trump administration; however, many of its components such as the Orion spacecraft were developed during the previous Constellation program (2005–2010) during the Bush administration, and after its cancellation during the Obama administration. Orion's first launch, and the first use of the Space Launch System, was originally set in 2016, but was rescheduled and launched on 16 November 2022 as the Artemis 1 mission, with robots and mannequins aboard. According to plan, the crewed Artemis 2 launch will take place in 2024, the Artemis 3 crewed lunar landing in 2025, the Artemis 4 docking with the Lunar Gateway in 2028, and future yearly landings on the Moon thereafter. However, some observers note that the program's cost and timeline are likely to be overrun and delayed due to, according to internal and external review, NASA's inadequate management of contractors.

Overview

The Artemis program is organized around a series of Space Launch System (SLS) missions. These space missions will increase in complexity and are scheduled to occur at intervals of a year or more. NASA and its partners have planned Artemis 1 through Artemis 5 missions; later Artemis missions have also been proposed. Each SLS mission centers on the launch of an SLS launch vehicle carrying an Orion spacecraft. Missions after Artemis 2 will depend on support missions launched by other organizations and spacecraft for support functions.

SLS missions
Artemis 1 (2022) was the successful uncrewed test of the SLS and Orion, and was the first test flight for both craft. The Artemis 1 mission placed Orion into a lunar orbit, and it then returned to Earth. The SLS Block 1 design uses the ICPS second stage, which performs the trans-lunar injection burn to send Orion to lunar space. For Artemis 1, Orion braked into a polar distant retrograde lunar orbit and remained for about six days before boosting back toward Earth. The Orion capsule separated from its service module, re-entered the atmosphere for aerobraking, and splashed down under parachutes. 

Artemis 2 (2024) is the planned first crewed test flight of SLS and the Orion spacecraft. The four crew members will perform extensive testing in Earth orbit, and Orion will then be boosted into a free-return trajectory around the Moon, which will return Orion back to Earth for re-entry and splashdown. Launch is scheduled no earlier than late November 2024.

Artemis 3 (2025) is the planned first crewed lunar landing. The mission depends on a support mission to place a Human Landing System (HLS) in place in a near-rectilinear halo orbit (NRHO) of the Moon prior to the launch of SLS/Orion. After HLS reaches NRHO, SLS/Orion will send the Orion spacecraft with a crew of four, which is intended to include the first woman and the first person of color to land on the Moon, to rendezvous and dock with HLS. Two astronauts will transfer to HLS, which will descend to the lunar surface and spend about 6.5 days on the surface. The astronauts will perform at least two EVAs on the surface before the HLS ascends to return them to a rendezvous with Orion. Orion will return the four astronauts to Earth. Launch is scheduled no earlier than December 2025.

Artemis 4 (2028) is the planned second crewed lunar landing mission. Orion and HLS will dock with the Lunar Gateway station in NRHO prior to the landing. A prior support mission will deliver the first two gateway modules to NRHO. The extra power of this mission's SLS Block 1B will allow it to deliver the I-HAB gateway module for connection to the Gateway. Launch is scheduled no earlier than September 2028.

Artemis 5 (2029) is the planned third crewed lunar landing, which will deliver four astronauts to the Gateway Space Station. The mission will deliver the European Space Agency's ESPRIT refueling and communications module and a Canadian-built robotic arm system for the Gateway. Also delivered will be NASA's Lunar Terrain Vehicle. Launch is scheduled no earlier than September 2029.

Support missions
Support missions include robotic landers, delivery of Gateway modules, Gateway logistics, delivery of the HLS, and delivery of elements of the Moon base. Most of these missions are executed under NASA contracts to commercial providers.

Under the Commercial Lunar Payload Services (CLPS) program, several robotic landers will deliver scientific instruments and robotic rovers to the lunar surface after Artemis 1. Additional CLPS missions are planned throughout the Artemis program to deliver payloads to the Moon base. These include habitat modules and rovers in support of crewed missions.

The Human Landing System (HLS) is a spacecraft that can convey crew members from NRHO to the lunar surface, support them on the surface, and return them to NRHO. Each crewed landing needs one HLS, although some or all of the spacecraft may be reusable. Each HLS must be launched from Earth and delivered to NRHO in one or more launches. The initial commercial contract was awarded to SpaceX for two Starship HLS missions, one uncrewed and one crewed as part of Artemis 3. These two missions each require one HLS launch and multiple fueling launches, all on SpaceX Starship launchers. , NASA has also exercised an option under the initial contract to commission an upgraded Starship HLS design and third demonstration lunar mission under new sustainability rules it is drafting. It intends to pursue another HLS design from outside SpaceX in parallel, for redundancy and competition.

The first two Gateway modules (PPE and HALO) will be delivered to NRHO in a single launch using a Falcon Heavy launcher. Originally planned to be available prior to Artemis 3, as of 2021 it is planned for availability before Artemis 4.

The Gateway will be resupplied and supported by launches of Dragon XL spacecraft launched by Falcon Heavy. Each Dragon XL will remain attached to Gateway for up to six months. the Dragon XLs will not return to Earth, but will be disposed of, probably by deliberate crashes on the lunar surface.

History

Early history
The Artemis program incorporates several major components of previously canceled NASA programs and missions, including the Constellation program and the Asteroid Redirect Mission. Originally legislated by the NASA Authorization Act of 2005, Constellation included the development of Ares I, Ares V, and the Orion Crew Exploration Vehicle. The program ran from the early 2000s until 2010.

In May 2009, President Barack Obama established the Augustine Committee to take into account several objectives including support for the International Space Station, development of missions beyond low Earth orbit (including the Moon, Mars, and near-Earth objects), and utilization of the commercial space industry within defined budget limits. The committee concluded that the Constellation program was massively underfunded and that a 2020 Moon landing was impossible. Constellation was subsequently put on hold.

On 15 April 2010, President Obama spoke at the Kennedy Space Center, announcing the administration's plans for NASA and cancelling the non-Orion elements of Constellation on the premise that the program had become nonviable. He instead proposed US$6 billion in additional funding and called for development of a new heavy lift rocket program to be ready for construction by 2015 with crewed missions to Mars orbit by the mid-2030s.

On 11 October 2010, President Obama signed into law the NASA Authorization Act of 2010, which included requirements for the immediate development of the Space Launch System as a follow-on launch vehicle to the Space Shuttle, and continued development of a Crew Exploration Vehicle to be capable of supporting missions beyond low Earth orbit starting in 2016, while making use of the workforce, assets, and capabilities of the Space Shuttle program, Constellation program, and other NASA programs. The law also invested in space technologies and robotics capabilities tied to the overall space exploration framework, ensured continued support for Commercial Orbital Transportation Services, Commercial Resupply Services, and expanded the Commercial Crew Development program.

On 30 June 2017, President Donald Trump signed an executive order to re-establish the National Space Council, chaired by Vice-President Mike Pence. The Trump administration's first budget request kept Obama-era human spaceflight programs in place: Commercial Resupply Services, Commercial Crew Development, the Space Launch System, and the Orion spacecraft for deep space missions, while reducing Earth science research and calling for the elimination of NASA's education office.

Redefinition and naming as Artemis 

On 11 December 2017, President Trump signed Space Policy Directive 1, a change in national space policy that provides for a U.S.-led, integrated program with private sector partners for a human return to the Moon, followed by missions to Mars and beyond. The policy calls for the NASA administrator to "lead an innovative and sustainable program of exploration with commercial and international partners to enable human expansion across the Solar System and to bring back to Earth new knowledge and opportunities". The effort intends to more effectively organize government, private industry, and international efforts toward returning humans to the Moon, and laying the foundation of eventual human exploration of Mars. Space Policy Directive 1 authorized the lunar-focused campaign. The campaign (later named Artemis) draws upon legacy US spacecraft programs including the Orion space capsule, the Lunar Gateway space station, Commercial Lunar Payload Services, and also creates entirely new programs such as the Human Landing System. The in-development Space Launch System is expected to serve as the primary launch vehicle for Orion, while commercial launch vehicles will launch various other elements of the program.

On 26 March 2019, Vice President Mike Pence announced that NASA's Moon landing goal would be accelerated by four years with a planned landing in 2024. On 14 May 2019, NASA Administrator Jim Bridenstine announced that the new program would be named Artemis, after the goddess of the Moon in Greek mythology who is the twin sister of Apollo. Despite the immediate new goals, Mars missions by the 2030s were still intended .

In mid-2019, NASA requested US$1.6 billion in additional funding for Artemis for fiscal year 2020, while the Senate Appropriations Committee requested from NASA a five-year budget profile which is needed for evaluation and approval by Congress.

In February 2020, the White House requested a funding increase of 12% to cover the Artemis program as part of its fiscal year 2021 budget. The total budget would have been US$25.2 billion per year with US$3.7 billion dedicated towards a Human Landing System. NASA Chief Financial Officer Jeff DeWit said he thought the agency has "a very good shot" to get this budget through Congress despite Democratic concerns around the program. However, in July 2020 the House Appropriations Committee rejected the White House's requested funding increase. The bill proposed in the House dedicated only US$700 million towards the Human Landing System, 81% (US$3 billion) short of the requested amount.

In April 2020, NASA awarded funding to Blue Origin, Dynetics, and SpaceX for competing 10-month-long preliminary design studies for the HLS.

Throughout February 2021, Acting Administrator of NASA Steve Jurczyk reiterated those budget concerns when asked about the project's schedule, clarifying that "The 2024 lunar landing goal may no longer be a realistic target [...]".

On 4 February 2021, the Biden Administration endorsed the Artemis program. More specifically, White House Press Secretary Jen Psaki expressed the Biden administration's "support [for] this effort and endeavor".

On 16 April 2021, NASA contracted SpaceX to develop, manufacture, and fly two lunar landing flights with the Starship HLS lunar lander. Blue Origin and Dynetics protested the award to the GAO on 26 April. After the GAO rejected the protests, Blue Origin sued NASA over the award, and NASA agreed to stop work on the contract until 1 November 2021 as the lawsuit proceeded. The judge dismissed the suit on 4 November 2021 and NASA resumed work with SpaceX.

On 25 September 2021, NASA released its first digital, interactive graphic novel in celebration of National Comic Book Day. "First Woman: NASA's Promise for Humanity" is the fictional story of Callie Rodriguez, the first woman to explore the Moon.

On 15 November 2021, an audit of NASA's Office of Inspector General estimated the true cost of the Artemis program at about $93 billion until 2025.

In addition to the initial SpaceX contract, NASA awarded two rounds of separate contracts in May 2019 and September 2021, on aspects of the HLS to encourage alternative designs, separately from the initial HLS development effort. It announced in March 2022 that it was developing new sustainability rules and pursuing both a Starship HLS upgrade (an option under the initial SpaceX contract) and new competing alternative designs. These came after criticism from members of Congress over lack of redundancy and competition, and led NASA to ask for additional support.

Launch 

Artemis 1 was originally scheduled for late 2016, and as delays accrued, eventually for late 2021, but the launch date was pushed back to 29 August 2022. Engine sensor problems caused a delay on that date; the next launch window was September 3. A fuel supply line leak in a quick disconnect arm on a ground tail service mast caused a further delay to a period between 23 September and 4 October. While the leak was partially repaired to a satisfactory condition, weather delays due to Hurricane Ian forced NASA managers to begin preparing for the stack's rollback to the Vehicle Assembly Building and call off the September–early October launch window.

In October 2022, NASA launch managers decided on a new launch date of 14 November, with backup options for 16 November and 19 November. In early November, NASA launch managers ruled out the 14 November option and made preparations to secure the SLS at the pad for Tropical Storm Nicole, after which launch was planned for 16 November.

On 16 November 2022, at 01:47:44 EST (06:47:44 UTC), Artemis 1 successfully launched from the Kennedy Space Center.

Artemis 1 was completed at 09:40 PST (17:40 UTC) on 11 December 2022, when the Orion spacecraft splashed down in the Pacific Ocean, west of Baja California, after a record-breaking mission, which saw Artemis travel more than 1.4 million miles on a path around the Moon before returning safely to Earth. The splashdown occurred 50 years to the day since NASA's Apollo 17 moon landing; the last astronaut mission to touch down on the lunar surface.

Supporting programs 
Implementation of the Artemis program will require additional programs, projects, and commercial launchers to support the construction of the Gateway, launch resupply missions to the station, and deploy numerous robotic spacecraft and instruments to the lunar surface. Several precursor robotic missions are being coordinated through the Commercial Lunar Payload Services (CLPS) program, which is dedicated to scouting and characterization of lunar resources as well as testing principles for in-situ resource utilization.

Commercial Lunar Payload Services 

In March 2018, NASA established the Commercial Lunar Payload Services (CLPS) program with the aim of sending small robotic landers and rovers mostly to the lunar south pole region as a precursor to and in support of crewed missions. The main goals include scouting of lunar resources, in situ resource utilization (ISRU) feasibility testing, and lunar science. NASA is awarding commercial providers indefinite delivery/indefinite quantity contracts to develop and fly lunar landers with scientific payloads. The first phase considered proposals capable of delivering at least  of payload by the end of 2021.

In November 2018, NASA announced the first nine companies that were qualified to bid on the CLPS transportation service contracts (see list below). On 31 May 2019, three of those were awarded lander contracts: Astrobotic Technology, Intuitive Machines, and OrbitBeyond. On 29 July 2019, NASA announced that it had granted OrbitBeyond's request to be released from obligations under the contract citing "internal corporate challenges".

The first twelve payloads and experiments from NASA centers were announced on 21 February 2019. On 1 July 2019, NASA announced the selection of twelve additional payloads, provided by universities and industry. Seven of these are scientific investigations while five are technology demonstrations.

The Lunar Surface Instrument and Technology Payloads (LSITP) program was soliciting payloads in 2019 that do not require significant additional development. They will include technology demonstrators to advance lunar science or the commercial development of the Moon.

In November 2019, NASA added five contractors to the group of companies who are eligible to bid to send large payloads to the surface of the moon under the CLPS program: Blue Origin, Ceres Robotics, Sierra Nevada Corporation, SpaceX, and Tyvak Nano-Satellite Systems.

In April 2020, NASA selected Masten Space Systems for a follow-on CLPS delivery of cargo to the Moon in 2022. On 23 June 2021, Masten Space Systems announced it was delayed until November 2023. Dave Masten, the founder and chief technology officer, blamed the delay on the COVID pandemic and industry-wide supply chain issues.

In February 2021, NASA selected Firefly Aerospace for a CLPS launch to Mare Crisium in mid-2023.

VIPER 

The VIPER (Volatiles Investigating Polar Exploration Rover) is a lunar rover by NASA planned to be delivered to the surface of the Moon in November 2024. The rover will be tasked with prospecting for lunar resources in permanently shadowed areas in the lunar south pole region, especially by mapping the distribution and concentration of water ice. The mission builds on a previous NASA rover concept called Resource Prospector, which was cancelled in 2018.

The VIPER rover is part of the Lunar Discovery and Exploration Program managed by the Science Mission Directorate at NASA Headquarters, and it is meant to support the crewed Artemis program. NASA's Ames Research Center is managing the rover project. The hardware for the rover is being designed by the Johnson Space Center, while the instruments are provided by Ames Research Center, Kennedy Space Center, and Honeybee Robotics. , the estimated cost of the mission is US$433.5 million.

The VIPER rover will operate near the lunar south pole at Nobile Crater. VIPER is planned to travel several kilometers, collecting data on different kinds of soil environments affected by light and temperature — those in complete darkness, occasional light, and in constant sunlight. Once it enters a permanently shadowed location, it will operate on battery power alone and will not be able to recharge them until it drives to a sunlit area. Its total operation time will be approximately 100 Earth days.

Both the launcher and the lander to be used will be competitively provided through the Commercial Lunar Payload Services (CLPS) contractors, with Astrobotic delivering the Griffin lander and SpaceX providing the Falcon Heavy launch vehicle.

International contractors

Artemis Accords 

On 5 May 2020, Reuters reported that the Trump administration was drafting a new international agreement outlining the laws for mining on the Moon. NASA Administrator Jim Bridenstine officially announced the Artemis Accords on 15 May 2020. It consists of a series of bilateral agreements between the governments of participating nations in the Artemis program "grounded in the Outer Space Treaty of 1967". The Artemis Accords have been criticized by some American researchers as "a concerted, strategic effort to redirect international space cooperation in favor of short-term U.S. commercial interests". The Accords were signed by the United States, Australia, Canada, Japan, Luxembourg, Italy, the United Kingdom, and the United Arab Emirates on 13 October 2020, and later signed by Ukraine. In May 2021, South Korea joined as the 10th signatory state of the Artemis Accords, with New Zealand following later the same month. Brazil became the 12th signatory country in June 2021. Poland became the 13th signatory country in October 2021. Mexico signed in December 2021. Israel signed in January 2022, Romania and Singapore in March 2022, Colombia signed in May 2022, France signed in June 2022, followed by Saudi Arabia in July 2022.

Exploration Ground Systems (EGS) 

The Exploration Ground Systems (EGS) Program is one of three NASA programs based at NASA's Kennedy Space Center in Florida. EGS was established to develop and operate the systems and facilities necessary to process and launch rockets and spacecraft during assembly, transport, and launch. EGS is preparing the infrastructure to support NASA's Space Launch System (SLS) rocket and its payloads, such as the Orion spacecraft for Artemis 1.

Gateway Logistics Services 

The Lunar Gateway is a station set to be constructed in lunar orbit, and the Gateway Logistics Services program will provide cargo and other supplies to the station, even when crews are not present. , only SpaceX's supply vehicle, known as Dragon XL, is planned to supply the Gateway. Dragon XL is a version of the Dragon spacecraft, to be launched by the Falcon Heavy. Unlike Dragon 2 and its predecessor, it is intended to be an expendable spacecraft.

Launch vehicles 
As of the early mission concepts outlined by NASA in May 2020 and refined by the HLS contract award in July 2021, launch vehicles planned to be used will include the NASA Space Launch System for Orion, SpaceX Starship for the HLS, and Falcon Heavy for Gateway components, as well as launch vehicles that are contracted for the various CLPS cargo providers. The European Ariane 6 was also proposed to be part of the program in July 2019.

The Power and Propulsion Element (PPE) module and the Habitation and Logistics Outpost (HALO) of the Gateway, which were previously planned for the SLS Block 1B, will now fly together on a Falcon Heavy in November 2024. The Gateway will be supported and resupplied by approximately 28 commercial cargo missions launched by undetermined commercial launch vehicles. The Gateway Logistics Services (GLS) will be in charge of the resupply missions. GLS has also contracted for the construction of a resupply vehicle, Dragon XL, capable of remaining docked to the Gateway for one year of operations, providing and generating its own power while docked, and capable of autonomous disposal at the end of its mission.

In May 2019, the plan was for components of a crewed lunar lander to be deployed to the Gateway on commercial launchers before the arrival of the first crewed mission, Artemis 3. An alternative approach where the HLS and Orion dock together directly was discussed.

As late as mid-2019, NASA considered use of Delta IV Heavy and Falcon Heavy to launch a crewed Orion mission given SLS delays. Given the complexity of conversion to a different vehicle, the agency ultimately decided to use only the SLS to launch astronauts.

Space Launch System 

The Space Launch System (SLS) is a United States super heavy-lift expendable launch vehicle, which has been under development since its announcement in 2011. The SLS is the main launch vehicle of the Artemis lunar program, . Starting in 2028, Block 1B is intended to debut the Exploration Upper Stage (EUS) and launch the notional Artemis 4-7. Block 2 is intended to enable crewed launches to Mars. The SLS will launch the Orion spacecraft and use the ground operations capabilities and launch facilities at NASA's Kennedy Space Center in Florida.

In March 2019, the Trump Administration released its Fiscal Year 2020 Budget Request for NASA. This budget did not initially include any money for the Block 1B and Block 2 variants of SLS, but later a request for a budget increase of $1.6 billion towards SLS, Orion, and crewed landers was made. Block 1B is currently intended to debut on Artemis 4 and will be used mainly for co-manifested crew transfers and logistics rather than constructing the Gateway as initially planned. An uncrewed Block 1B was planned to launch the Lunar Surface Asset in 2028, the first lunar outpost of the Artemis program, but now that launch has been moved to a commercial launcher. Block 2 development will most likely start in the late 2020s after NASA is regularly visiting the lunar surface and shifts focus towards Mars.

In October 2019, NASA authorized Boeing to purchase materials in bulk for more SLS rockets ahead of the announcement of a new contract. The contract was expected to support up to ten core stages and eight Exploration Upper Stages for the SLS 1B to transfer heavy payloads of up to 40 metric tons on a lunar trajectory.

SpaceX Starship

The SpaceX Starship system is a fully-reusable super heavy-lift launch system under development. It consists of a booster named Super Heavy and a second stage named Starship. Starship is both a second stage and a spacecraft. The system is planned to launch crew or cargo Starship to a parking low Earth orbit where to meet up an additional Super Heavy tanker (also reusable) launch for refueling necessary to the Gateway or other lunar orbits.  It is also qualified to be bid for CLPS launches.

Falcon Heavy

The SpaceX Falcon Heavy is a partially reusable heavy-lift launcher. It will be used to launch the first two Gateway modules into NRHO. It will also be used to launch the Dragon XL spacecraft on supply missions to Gateway, and it is qualified to be bid for other launches under the CLPS program. It was selected under CLPS to launch the VIPER mission.

CLPS launchers
Under the CLPS program, qualified CLPS vendors can use any launcher that meets their mission requirements.

Spacecraft

Orion 

Orion is a class of partially reusable spacecraft to be used in the Artemis program. The spacecraft consists of a Crew Module (CM) space capsule designed by Lockheed Martin and the European Service Module (ESM) manufactured by Airbus Defence and Space. Capable of supporting a crew of six beyond low Earth orbit, Orion is equipped with solar panels, an automated docking system, and glass cockpit interfaces modeled after those used in the Boeing 787 Dreamliner. It has a single AJ10 engine for primary propulsion, and others including reaction control system engines. Although designed to be compatible with other launch vehicles, Orion is primarily intended to launch atop a Space Launch System (SLS) rocket, with a tower launch escape system.

Orion was originally conceived by Lockheed Martin as a proposal for the Crew Exploration Vehicle (CEV) to be used in NASA's Constellation program. Lockheed Martin's proposal defeated a competing proposal by Northrop Grumman, and was selected by NASA in 2006 to be the CEV. Originally designed with a service module featuring a new "Orion Main Engine" and a pair of circular solar panels, the spacecraft was to be launched atop the Ares I rocket. Following the cancellation of the Constellation program in 2010, Orion was heavily redesigned for use in NASA's Journey to Mars initiative; later named Moon to Mars. The SLS replaced the Ares I as Orion's primary launch vehicle, and the service module was replaced with a design based on the European Space Agency's Automated Transfer Vehicle. A development version of Orion's CM was launched in 2014 during Exploration Flight Test-1, while at least four test articles were produced. By 2022, three flight-worthy Orion crew modules have been built, with an additional one ordered, for use in the Artemis program; the first of these was due to be launched on 30 November 2020, however Artemis 1 did not launch until 16 November 2022. It was reported that NASA and Lockheed Martin had found a failure with a component in one of the Orion spacecraft's power data units but NASA later clarified that it did not expect the issue to affect the Artemis 1 launch date.

Gateway 

NASA's Gateway is an in-development mini-space station in lunar orbit intended to serve as a solar-powered communication hub, science laboratory, short-term habitation module, and holding area for rovers and other robots. While the project is led by NASA, the Gateway is meant to be developed, serviced, and utilized in collaboration with commercial and international partners: Canada (Canadian Space Agency) (CSA), Europe (European Space Agency) (ESA), and Japan (JAXA).

The Power and Propulsion Element (PPE) started development at the Jet Propulsion Laboratory during the now canceled Asteroid Redirect Mission (ARM). The original concept was a robotic, high performance solar electric spacecraft that would retrieve a multi-ton boulder from an asteroid and bring it to lunar orbit for study. When ARM was canceled, the solar electric propulsion was repurposed for the Gateway. The PPE will allow access to the entire lunar surface and act as a space tug for visiting craft. It will also serve as the command and communications center of the Gateway. The PPE is intended to have a mass of 8-9 tonnes and the capability to generate 50 kW of solar electric power for its ion thrusters, which can be supplemented by chemical propulsion.

The Habitation and Logistics Outpost (HALO), also called the Minimal Habitation Module (MHM) and formerly known as the Utilization Module, will be built by Northrop Grumman Innovation Systems (NGIS). A single Falcon Heavy equipped with an extended fairing will launch the PPE together with the HALO in November 2024. The HALO is based on a Cygnus Cargo resupply module to the outside of which radial docking ports, body mounted radiators (BMRs), batteries and communications antennae will be added. The HALO will be a scaled-down habitation module, yet, it will feature a functional pressurized volume providing sufficient command, control, and data handling capabilities, energy storage and power distribution, thermal control, communications and tracking capabilities, two axial and up to two radial docking ports, stowage volume, environmental control and life support systems to augment the Orion spacecraft and support a crew of four for at least 30 days.

In March 2020, Doug Loverro, NASA's associate administrator for human exploration and operations at that time, removed the Gateway construction from the 2024 critical path to clear up funding for the HLS. He stated that the PPE could face delays and that moving it back to 2026 would allow for a more refined vehicle. It is also worth noting that the international partners on the Gateway would not have their modules ready until 2026. It was made a requirement that all Human Landing System proposals would be capable of free flight without the Gateway.

On 30 April 2020, a key to NASA's vision for a "sustainable" crew presence on or near the Moon, the Gateway station, was announced to be optional, rather than required, in mission planning. NASA officials originally hoped the Gateway would be in position near the Moon in time for the Artemis 3 mission in 2024, allowing elements of the lunar lander to be assembled, or aggregated, at the Gateway before the arrival of astronauts on an Orion crew capsule. Jim Bridenstine told Spaceflight Now, the Artemis 3 mission will no longer go through the Gateway, but NASA is not backing away from the program.

In late October 2020, NASA and European Space Agency (ESA) finalized their agreement to collaborate in the Gateway program. ESA will provide a habitat module in partnership with JAXA (I-HAB) and a refueling module (ESPRIT). In return Europe will have three flight opportunities to launch crew aboard the Orion crew capsule, which they will provide the service module for.

Dragon XL 
On 27 March 2020, SpaceX revealed the Dragon XL resupply spacecraft to carry pressurized and unpressurized cargo, experiments and other supplies to NASA's planned Lunar Gateway under a Gateway Logistics Services (GLS) contract. The equipment delivered by Dragon XL missions could include sample collection materials, spacesuits and other items astronauts may need on the Gateway and on the surface of the Moon, according to NASA. It will launch on SpaceX Falcon Heavy rockets from LC-39A at the Kennedy Space Center in Florida. The Dragon XL will stay at the Gateway for 6 to 12 months at a time, when research payloads inside and outside the cargo vessel could be operated remotely, even when crews are not present. There is no requirement for a return to Earth. At the end of the mission the Dragon XL must be able to undock and dispose of the same mass it can bring to the Gateway, by moving the spacecraft to a heliocentric orbit.

Human Landing System 
The Human Landing System (HLS) is a critical component of the Artemis mission. This system transports crew from lunar orbit (the Gateway or an Orion spacecraft) to the lunar surface, acts as a lunar habitat, and then transports the crew back to lunar orbit.

Development history

NASA elected to have the HLS designed and developed by commercial vendors. NASA called for proposals, and five vendors responded. In April 2020, NASA awarded three competing design contracts, and in April 2021, NASA selected the Starship HLS to proceed to development and production.

Separately from the design and development program for the first two HLS spacecraft, NASA has multiple smaller contracts to study elements of alternative HLS designs. Eleven contracts were awarded in May 2019 and five were awarded in September 2021.

Starship HLS 

The Starship Human Landing System (Starship HLS) was the winner selected by NASA for potential use for long-duration crewed lunar landings as part of NASA's Artemis program.

Starship HLS is a variant of SpaceX's Starship spacecraft  optimized to operate on and around the Moon. In contrast to the Starship spacecraft from which it derives, Starship HLS will never re-enter an atmosphere, so it does not have a heat shield or flight control surfaces. In contrast to other proposed HLS designs that used multiple stages, the entire spacecraft will land on the Moon and will then launch from the Moon. Like other Starship variants, Starship HLS has Raptor engines mounted at the tail as its primary propulsion system. However, when it is within "tens of meters" of the lunar surface during descent and ascent, it will use high-thrust meth/ox RCS thrusters located mid-body instead of the Raptors to avoid raising dust via plume impingement. A solar array located on the nose below the docking port provides electrical power. Elon Musk stated that Starship HLS would be able to deliver "potentially up to 200 tons" to the lunar surface.

Starship HLS would be launched to Earth orbit using the SpaceX Super Heavy booster, and would use a series of tanker spacecraft to refuel the Starship HLS vehicle in Earth orbit for lunar transit and lunar landing operations. Starship HLS would then boost itself to lunar orbit for rendezvous with Orion. In the mission concept, a NASA Orion spacecraft would carry a NASA crew to the lander, where they would depart and descend to the surface of the Moon. After lunar surface operations, Starship HLS would lift off from the lunar surface acting as a single-stage-to-orbit (SSTO) vehicle and return the crew to Orion.

HERACLES lander

ESA approved the project in November 2019. Its first mission is envisioned for launch in the mid to late 2020s aboard an Ariane 6.

The rover would then traverse several kilometers across the Schrödinger basin on the far side of the Moon to explore and collect more samples to load on the next EL3 lander. The ascent module would return each time to the Gateway, where it would be captured by the Canadian robotic arm and samples transferred to an Orion spacecraft for transport to Earth with returning astronauts.

Astronauts 
On 10 January 2020, NASA's 22nd astronaut group, nicknamed the "Turtles", graduated and were assigned to the Artemis program. The group includes two Canadian Space Agency (CSA) astronauts. The group earned their nickname from the prior astronaut group, "The 8-Balls", as is a tradition dating back to "The Mercury Seven" in 1962 which subsequently provided the "Next Nine" with their nickname. They were given this name, for the most part, because of Hurricane Harvey. Some of the astronauts will fly on the Artemis missions to the Moon and may be part of the first crew to fly to Mars.

Artemis team 1
On 9 December 2020, Vice President Mike Pence announced the first group of 18 astronauts (all American, including 9 male and 9 female from different backgrounds), the 1st Artemis team, who could be selected as astronauts of early missions of the Artemis program:

 Joe Acaba
 Kayla Barron
 Raja Chari
 Matthew Dominick
 Victor Glover
 Warren Hoburg
 Jonny Kim
 Christina Koch
 Kjell Lindgren
 Nicole Mann
 Anne McClain
 Jessica Meir
 Jasmin Moghbeli
 Kathleen Rubins
 Frank Rubio
 Scott Tingle
 Jessica Watkins
 Stephanie Wilson

Chief Astronaut Reid Wiseman said in August 2022, however, that all 42 active members of the NASA Astronaut Corps, and the ten more training as NASA Astronaut Group 23, are eligible for Artemis 2 and later flights.

Planned surface operations

NASA prospecting and research programs 
As of February 2020, a lunar stay during a Phase 1 Artemis mission will be about seven days and will have five extravehicular activities (EVA). A notional concept of operations (i.e., a hypothetical but possible plan) would include the following: On Day 1 of the stay, astronauts touchdown on the Moon but do not conduct an EVA. Instead, they prepare for the EVA scheduled for the next day in what is referred to as "The Road to EVA". On Day 2, the astronauts open the hatch on the Human Landing System and embark on EVA 1 which will be six hours long. It will include collecting a contingency sample, conducting public affairs activities, deploying the experiment package, and acquiring samples. The astronauts will stay close to the landing site on this first EVA. EVA 2 begins on day 3. The astronauts characterize and collect samples from permanently shadowed regions. Day 4 will not include an EVA but Day 5 will. EVA 3 may include activities such as collecting samples from an ejecta blanket. Day 6 will have the two astronauts deploy a geotechnical instrument alongside an environmental monitoring station for in-situ resource utilization (ISRU). Day 7 will have the final and shortest EVA; this EVA will only last one hour rather than the others' six hours in duration from egress to ingress and mostly comprises preparations for the lunar liftoff, including jettisoning hardware. Once the final EVA is concluded, the astronauts will return into the Human Landing System and the vehicle will launch from the surface and join up with Orion/Gateway.

Artemis Base Camp 

Artemis Base Camp is the prospective lunar base that was proposed to be established at the end of the 2020s. It would consist of three main modules: the Foundational Surface Habitat, the Habitable Mobility Platform, and the Lunar Terrain Vehicle. It would support missions of up to two months and be used to study technologies to use on Mars. The idea would be to build upon this initial base site for decades through both Government and commercial programs. Currently Shackleton Crater is the prime target for this outpost due to its wide variety of lunar geography and water ice. It would fall under the guidelines of the Outer Space Treaty.

Foundational Surface Habitat 

Little is known about the surface outpost with most information coming from studies and launch manifests that include its launch. It would be commercially built and possibly commercially launched in 2028 along with the Mobile Habitat. The first habitat is referred to as the Artemis Foundation Habitat formerly the Artemis Surface Asset. Current launch plans show that landing it on the surface would be similar to the HLS. The pressurized habitat would be sent to the Gateway where it would then be attached to a descent stage separately launched from a commercial launcher, it would utilize the same transfer stage used for the HLS. Other designs from 2019 see it being launched from an SLS Block 1B as a single unit and landing directly on the surface. It would then be hooked up to a surface power system launched by a CLPS mission and tested by the Artemis 6 crew. The location of the base would be in the south pole region and most likely be a site visited by prior crewed and robotic missions.

Habitable Mobility Platform 

The Habitable Mobility Platform would be a large pressurized rover used to transport crews across large distances. NASA has developed multiple pressurized rovers including the Space Exploration Vehicle built for the Constellation program which was fabricated and tested. In the 2020 flight manifest it was referred to as the Mobile Habitat suggesting it could fill a similar role to the ILREC Lunar Bus. It would be ready for the crew to use on the surface but could also be autonomously controlled from the Gateway or other locations. Mark Kirasich, who is the acting director of NASA's Advanced Exploration Systems, has stated that the current plan is to partner with JAXA and Toyota to develop a closed cabin rover to support crews for up to 14 days (currently known as Lunar Cruiser). "It's very important to our leadership at the moment to involve JAXA in a major surface element", he said. "... The Japanese, and their auto industry, have a very strong interest in rover-type things. So there was an idea to — even though we have done a lot of work — to let the Japanese lead development of a pressurized rover. So right now, that's the direction we're heading in". In regards to the SEV, Senior Lunar Scientist Clive Neal said "Under Constellation NASA had a sophisticated rover put together, It's pretty sad if it's never going to get to the Moon". but also said that he understands the different scopes of the Constellation Program and Artemis program and the focus on international collaboration.

Moon rover

Lunar light vehicle development 

In February 2020, NASA released two requests for information regarding both a crewed and uncrewed unpressurized surface rover. The LTV would be propositioned by a CLPS vehicle before the Artemis 3 mission. It would be used to transport crews around the exploration site. It would serve a similar function as the Apollo Lunar Rover. In July 2020, NASA will move to formally establish a program office for the rover at the Johnson Space Center in Houston.

Space suits 

The Artemis program will make use of two types of space suit revealed in October 2019: the Exploration Extravehicular Mobility Unit (xEMU), and the Orion Crew Survival System (OCSS).

On 10 August 2021, a NASA Office of Inspector General audit reported a conclusion that the spacesuits would not be ready until April 2025 at the earliest, likely delaying the mission from the planned late 2024. In response to the IG report, SpaceX indicated that they could provide the suits.

Commercial spacesuits
NASA published a draft RFP to procure commercially-produced spacesuits in order to meet the 2024 schedule.

On 2 June 2022, NASA announced that commercially produced spacesuits would be developed by Axiom Space and Collins Aerospace.

Artemis flights

Orion testing 

A prototype version of the Orion Crew Module was launched on Exploration Flight Test-1 on 5 December 2014 atop a Delta IV Heavy rocket.

The Ascent Abort-2 test on 2 July 2019 tested the final iteration of the launch abort system on a  Orion boilerplate at maximum aerodynamic load, using a custom Minotaur IV-derived launch vehicle built by Orbital ATK.

Missions 
, all crewed Artemis missions will launch on the Space Launch System from Kennedy Space Center Launch Complex 39B. Current plans call for some supporting hardware to be launched on other vehicles and from other launch pads.

Proposed missions 
In November 2021, plans to return humans to the Moon in 2024 were cancelled, and the Artemis 3 mission was delayed until at least 2025. However, plans remain in place for crewed Artemis 4 through 9 missions to launch yearly starting from 2028, testing in situ resource utilization and nuclear power on the lunar surface with a partially reusable lander. Artemis 7 would deliver in 2031 a crew of four astronauts to a Surface lunar outpost known as the Foundation Habitat along with the Mobile Habitat. The Foundation Habitat would be launched back to back with the Mobile Habitat by an undetermined super heavy launcher and would be used for extended crewed lunar surface missions. Prior to each crewed Artemis mission, various payloads to the Gateway, such as refueling depots and expendable elements of the lunar lander, would be deployed by commercial launch vehicles. The most updated manifest includes missions suggested in NASA's timelines that have not been designed or funded from Artemis 4-9.

Support missions

Criticism 
The Artemis program has received criticisms from several space professionals.

Mark Whittington, who is a contributor to The Hill and an author of several space exploration studies, stated in an article that the "lunar orbit project doesn't help us get back to the Moon".

Aerospace engineer, author, and Mars Society founder Robert Zubrin has voiced his distaste for the Gateway which is part of the Artemis program as of 2027. He presented an alternative approach to a 2024 crewed lunar landing called "Moon Direct", a successor to his proposed Mars Direct. His vision phases out the SLS and Orion, replacing them with the SpaceX launch vehicles and SpaceX Dragon 2. It also proposes using a heavy ferry/lander that would be refueled on the lunar surface via in situ resource utilization and transfer the crew from LEO to the lunar surface. The concept bears a heavy resemblance to NASA's own Space Transportation System proposal from the 1970s.

Apollo 11 astronaut Buzz Aldrin disagrees with NASA's current goals and priorities, including their plans for a lunar outpost. He also questioned the benefit of the idea to "send a crew to an intermediate point in space, pick up a lander there and go down". However, Aldrin expressed support for Robert Zubrin's "Moon Direct" concept which involves lunar landers traveling from Earth orbit to the lunar surface and back.

House Authorization Bill of 2020 
The leadership of the House Science Committee introduced a bipartisan NASA authorization bill on 24 January 2020 that would significantly alter NASA's current plans to return humans to the Moon and rather would focus on a Mars orbital mission in 2033. Bill H.R. 5666 would change the lunar landing date from 2024 to 2028 and put the program as a whole underneath a larger space exploration plan. The bill became stuck in the House Committee on Science, Space, and Technology, and there were no committee votes or further action for the remainder of the congressional term. Major proposed changes included:

 Creation of a new Moon to Mars program office with a goal of landing humans on Mars "in a sustainable manner as soon as practicable"
 A 2028 target date for a lunar landing to allow the technology to mature
 A NASA developed expendable Human Landing System (HLS), something along the line of the Advanced Exploration Lander or the expendable Altair design 
 Launching both the Orion and HLS on SLS 1B rockets rather than splitting them between SLS and a commercial vehicle 
 The requirement of one uncrewed and one crewed test flight of the HLS before a lunar landing is attempted, something not currently required
 Once operational, the system would perform two lunar landings a year rather than one
 No base would be set up on the lunar surface rather, the missions would follow the "flag and footsteps" approach of Apollo
 Development of the Gateway as a separate program to test Mars transportation technologies and not be required for lunar operations
 ISRU technologies would be managed under a program separate from the Moon to Mars campaign and not be required for either mission
 International Space Station funding would be extended to 2030

Many of these changes, such as uncrewed HLS test flights and the development of the Gateway as no longer essential to Artemis, were implemented into the current timeline.

Gallery

See also 

 
 Chinese Lunar Exploration Program – Chinese crewed lunar program with international partners e.g. Russia.
 
 
 
 First Lunar Outpost – Crewed lunar program proposal from the SEI
 
 
 NASA Astronaut Group 23

Notes

References

Sources

External links 

 Moon to Mars portal at NASA
 Artemis program at NASA
 Monthly report by the Exploration Systems Development (ESD)

 
2010s in the United States
2020s in the United States
2020s in spaceflight
Orion (spacecraft)
Commercial Lunar Payload Services
Exploration of the Moon
Human spaceflight programs
NASA programs
Projects established in 2017